Kureika may refer to:

 Kureika River, a tributary of the Yenisei River, Russia
 Kureika Dam, a dam on the Kureika River
 Kureika Reservoir, a reservoir on the Kureika River
 Kureika (village), a village just north of the Arctic Circle near Turukhansk in Krasnoyarsk Krai, Russia